Langenau is a town in the county of Alb-Donau-Kreis, Baden-Württemberg, Germany.

Langenau may also refer to:

Places

Germany 
 , village in the borough of Brand-Erbisdorf, county of Mittelsachsen, Saxony
 Langenau (Flieden), village in the borough of Langenau der Gemeinde Flieden, county of Fulda, Hesse
 Langenau (Geroldsgrün), village in the municipality of Geroldsgrün, county of Hof, Bavaria
 , village in the borough of Hartha, county of Mittelsachsen, Saxony
 Langenau (Kreuztal), village in the borough of Kreuztal in the county of Siegen-Wittgenstein, North Rhine-Westphalia, see Buschhütten#Langenau
 , village in the borough of Schopfheim, county of Lörrach, Baden-Württemberg
 Langenau (Tettau), village in the borough of Tettau, county of Kronach, Bavaria, see Tettau (Oberfranken)
 Langenau (island) (Nonnenaue), an island in the Rhine south of Ginsheim

Poland 
 Czernica (Langenau über Hirschberg and Schloss Langenau), in the voivodeship of Lower Silesia
 Dłużyna Dolna (Nieder Langenau), village in the borough of Pieńsk (Penzig) in the voivodeship of Lower Silesia
 Dłużyna Górna (Ober Langenau), village in the borough of Pieńsk (Penzig) in the voivodeship of Lower Silesia
 Długopole Dolne (Niederlangenau)
 Długopole-Zdrój (Bad Langenau)
 Długopole Górne (Oberlangenau)
 Langenau near Danzig (Gdańsk), West Prussia
 Langenau near Rosenberg (Susz), West Prussia

Romania 
 Câmpulung, town in the county of Argeș in Wallachia

Czech Republic 
 Lánov, municipality in Trutnov district
 Skalice u České Lípy, municipality in Česká Lípa district
 Dolní Lánov (Nieder Langenau), municipality in Trutnov district
 Dlouhé, village in the borough of Nový Hrádek in Náchod district
 , abandoned village on the Hradiště Training Area in Karlovy Vary district
  (Ober Langenau), village in the borough of Lánov in Trutnov district
  (Mittel Langenau), village in the borough of Lánov in Trutnov district
 Malý Lánov (Klein Langenau), village of Dolní Lánov in Trutnov district

People 
 Amelie von Langenau (1830/33–1902), Baroness, Austrian Methodist, women's rights campaigner
  (1817–1881), Austrian diplomat
 Jutta Langenau (1933–1982), German swimmer,  MdV
 Ute Langenau (born 1966), German volleyball player

See also  
 Langenau Castle (in Obernhof, Rhein-Lahn-Kreis, Rhineland-Palatinate)
  (Stadium of SC Eltersdorf)
 Langau
 Langnau (disambiguation)
 
 Clydau, the present name of the Welsh town previously known as Llangeneu